The American Journal on Addictions is a bimonthly peer-reviewed medical journal covering addiction medicine. It was established in 1992 and is published by John Wiley & Sons on behalf of the American Academy of Addiction Psychiatry, of which it is the official journal. The editor-in-chief is Thomas R. Kosten (Baylor College of Medicine). According to the Journal Citation Reports, the journal has a 2020 impact factor of 3.076, ranking it 17th out of 37 journals in the category "Substance Abuse".

References

External links

Addiction medicine journals
Publications established in 1992
Bimonthly journals
Wiley (publisher) academic journals
English-language journals
Academic journals associated with learned and professional societies of the United States